Scoparia albipunctata is a moth in the family Crambidae. It was described by Herbert Druce in 1899. It is found in Costa Rica and Guatemala.

References

Moths described in 1899
Scorparia